Aleksandr Dmitriyevich Averin (born 11 April 1954) is a retired Soviet cyclist. He competed at the 1976 Summer Olympics in the road race and finished in 17th place. He won the multistage Peace Race individually in 1978 and with the Soviet team in 1977–1979. 

He retired from competitions in 1983 and moved to Odessa, Ukraine, where he worked as a cycling coach. From the early 1990s to 2004 he taught physical education in a military institute. His son Maksym is a competitive cyclist who lives in Italy.

References

External links
 

1954 births
Living people
Olympic cyclists of the Soviet Union
Cyclists at the 1976 Summer Olympics
Soviet male cyclists
Sportspeople from Baku
Cycling coaches